Mittelndorf is a village in Saxony, Germany, situated in the district of Sächsische Schweiz-Osterzgebirge. It was one of the villages that composed the municipality of Kirnitzschtal. Since 1 October 2012, it is part of the town Sebnitz.

History
The oldest structure of the village is the mill (Mittelndorfer Mühle), built in 1518.

Geography
Mittelndorf is located in the mountain range of Saxon Switzerland, not too far from the river Kirnitzsch. It lies on the S154 road, which links Bad Schandau and Sebnitz, between the villages of Altendorf and Lichtenhain.

Transport
Mittelndorf has got a rail stop on the Bautzen–Bad Schandau railway, situated in the forest close to the village. This stop has a rare peculiarity for a train station situated on a normal national rail line: it has not a road to reach it but a simple forest trail. A similar thing in Europe could be found, for example, in the stations of Kloster Marienthal (Engers-Au line, Germany); Pertosa, in southern Italy; or Corrour, in Scotland.

The village is also served by the suburban tramway line "Kirnitzschtalbahn" Bad Schandau–Lichtenhainer Wasserfall, with the stops of Mittelndorfer Mühle (at the mill) and Forsthaus, not too far from Mittelndorf.

See also
Mittelndorf railway station

References

External links

Former municipalities in Saxony
Sebnitz